The Lakewood Theater is a theater complex at 76 Theatre Road in Madison, Maine, on the shores of Lake Wesserunsett.  Founded in 1898 but only properly developed in 1901, it is one of the oldest summer theaters in the United States.  The theater was in the 1920s and 1930s one of the major off-Broadway stops, and now plays host the community theater productions of Curtain Up Enterprises.  The main auditorium is located on a former 1882 religious camp meeting sanctuary that was extensively altered in 1925-26 to accommodate the theater.  It was listed on the National Register of Historic Places in 1975.

Description and history
The Lakewood Theater complex is set on the western shore of Lake Wesserunsett, off United States Route 201 in eastern Madison.  The main theater building is a 2-1/2 story Colonial Revival wood frame structure with a gable roof.  A two-story porch extends across much of the front, with square paneled posts and diamond-pattern balustrade.

The property on which the theater is built was part of a larger resort area developed by owners of the area's trolley car network to draw people to use their facilities.  This particular property was where in 1882 a religious camp meeting sanctuary was built, which forms the core of the theater building.  In 1884 this building was converted into a skating rink, and in 1898 its use as a theater began.  The theater's rise in prominence began in 1901, when Herbert Swett took over its management, and oversaw improvements to its physical plant over a 20-year tenure.  By the mid-1920s, when the building achieved its present form, the theater was a major tryout location for Broadway shows.  After World War II, these types of shows declined, and the theater has since then primarily shown touring productions.  Numerous famous actors, including Vincent Price, Ethel Barrymore, and George M. Cohan have graced its stage.

Playwright John B. Hymer was known as the mayor of Lakewood and collabored with fellow playwright Samuel Shipman in Lakewood. He also built Colony House there in 1929. His son Warren Hymer stayed with him and went on to a career as a movie actor.

Significance 
In order to stimulate passenger traffic, many trolley car systems at the turn of the century participated in the development of amusement centers in scenic locations along their lines, particularly at terminal points. This was 'the great age of the trolley car and this form of transportation became, for a time, a major recreational outlet.  

Such a park was developed in 1895 in Lakewood Grove on the shore of Lake Wesserunsett by the Somerset Traction Company of Skowhegan, Maine. Along with other amusement features it established in 1898 the Lakewood Theater which between 1925 and 1941 became the most important summer theater in the country. It is now a renowned and important east coast ‘package’ theater, meaning that it presents theatrical productions done by touring professional companies headed by well known personalities. 

Its rise to eminence was started by Herbert L. Swett, a young man who, in 1901, became manager and started to develop an organization and physical plant that was to become the premier summer theater for two decades with the most prolonged ongoing record of summer seasons in America. From the 1920s until World War II it was the major tryout theater for potential Broadway productions and became known as “Broadway in Maine.”

The war created an interim cessation of productions in 1943 and 1944. But from 1945 to the present, the Lakewood Theater completed the transition so typical in summer theaters from a resident stock company to the “package” system with a new cast every week. 

The theater and resort aspects of Lakewood are closely related; the theater making the resort unique and the attractions of the resort making it possible to bring fine actors to Maine and draw theater patrons to Lakewood Grove for forty-five years. This felicitous partnership has made Lakewood the subject of much attention by the press and noted theater critics and commentators. 

Famous names in the annals of the American stage have been intimately connected with the history of Lakewood. In 1925 Howard Lindsay became director and helped to create through his talents and New York contacts the national reputation which the theater achieved. Stars like Dorothy Stickney and Walter Hampden began to grace the Lakewood Stage to be followed by George M. Cohan, Cornelia Otis Skinner, Vincent Price, Ethel Barrymore and many others who acted with the resident company. 

Lakewood  was  the scene of premiere performances of numerous later Broadway hits as well
which includes "Life With Father".

In recent years its stage has been graced by a host of stars and personalities from Broadway and Hollywood. The trolley cars have long since passed from the scene but the footlights at Lakewood continue to illuminate the theatrical tradition they began. 

No other playhouse more justly deserves the reputation of being the first summer theater in America. It was the wellspring of a theatrical tradition now firmly implanted on the American cultural scene.

See also
National Register of Historic Places listings in Somerset County, Maine

References

External links
Lakewood Theater web site

Bringing Broadway to Maine, history of Lakewood theater by J.B Oblak
Theatres on the National Register of Historic Places in Maine
Theatres in Maine
Colonial Revival architecture in Maine
Buildings and structures completed in 1898
Buildings and structures in Somerset County, Maine
National Register of Historic Places in Somerset County, Maine